Hands of Glory is the seventh studio album by American singer-songwriter Andrew Bird. It was released in October 2012 through Mom+Pop Records.

Track list

Other appearances

 "When the Helicopter Comes" is originally by The Handsome Family, appearing on the album In the Air
 "Orpheo" appears on Break It Yourself as "Orpheo Looks Back"
 "If I Needed You" is a Townes Van Zandt cover, from The Late Great Townes Van Zandt

Personnel
Andrew Bird - Violin, Guitar and Vocals
Martin Dosh - Drum Kit
Alan Hampton - Basses and Backing Vocals
Tift Merritt - Vocals and Guitar
Jeremy Ylvislaker - Guitar and Backing Vocals
Dan Dorff - Tambourine on "Spirograph"

Charts

References

2012 albums
Andrew Bird albums
Mom + Pop Music albums